2893 Peiroos  is a large Jupiter trojan from the Trojan camp, approximately  in diameter. It was discovered on 30 August 1975, by astronomers of the Felix Aguilar Observatory at the Leoncito Astronomical Complex in Argentina. The D-type asteroid has a rotation period of 8.96 hours and belongs to the 40 largest Jupiter trojans. It was named after Peiroos (Peirous) from Greek mythology.

Orbit and classification 

Peiroos is a dark Jovian asteroid orbiting in the trailing Trojan camp at Jupiter's  Lagrangian point, 60° behind its orbit in a 1:1 resonance (see Trojans in astronomy). It is a non-family asteroid in the Jovian background population. It orbits the Sun at a distance of 4.8–5.5 AU once every 11 years and 8 months (4,269 days; semi-major axis of 5.15 AU). Its orbit has an eccentricity of 0.08 and an inclination of 15° with respect to the ecliptic.

Physical characteristics 

In the Tholen classification, Peiroos has been characterized as a dark D-type asteroid.

Rotation period 

In October 1989, a rotational lightcurve of Peiroos was obtained from photometric observations by German and Italian astronomers. Lightcurve analysis gave a well-defined rotation period of 8.96 hours with a brightness variation of 0.30 magnitude. Between 2015 and 2017, photometric observations by Robert Stephens and collaborators at the Center for Solar System Studies in Landers, California, gave two concurring periods of 8.951 and 8.99 hours, both with an amplitude of 0.31 magnitude.

Diameter and albedo 

According to the surveys carried out by the Infrared Astronomical Satellite IRAS, the Japanese Akari satellite and the NEOWISE mission of NASA's Wide-field Infrared Survey Explorer, Peiroos measures between 86.76 and 87.46 kilometers in diameter and its surface has an albedo between 0.0469 and 0.048.

The Collaborative Asteroid Lightcurve Link derives an albedo of 0.0588 and a diameter of 87.67 kilometers based on an absolute magnitude of 8.98.

Naming 

This minor planet was named after Peiroos (Peirous), Thracian war leader from the city of Aenus and an ally of King Priam who fought courageously to defend Troy against the Greek during the Trojan War. The official naming citation was published by the Minor Planet Center on 25 September 1988.

Notes

References

External links 
 Asteroid Lightcurve Database (LCDB), query form (info )
 Dictionary of Minor Planet Names, Google books
 Discovery Circumstances: Numbered Minor Planets (1)-(5000) – Minor Planet Center
 
 

002893
002893
Named minor planets
002893
19750830